Amphitragulus is an extinct genus of Artiodactyla, of the family Palaeomerycidae, endemic to Europe from the Late Eocene until the Middle Miocene. It is the earliest known genus of the family, and has been found in Aragon (Spain), Ronheim (Germany), Sardinia (Italy), France and Kazakhstan and range from 33 - 15.97 million years old.

References 

Palaeomerycidae
Miocene even-toed ungulates
Neogene animals of Europe
Prehistoric even-toed ungulate genera